Hans-Jürgen Bradler (born 12 August 1948) is a retired German football goalkeeper.

Career statistics

References

External links
 

1948 births
Living people
Sportspeople from Bochum
German footballers
Bundesliga players
2. Bundesliga players
VfL Bochum players
SC Westfalia Herne players
Footballers at the 1972 Summer Olympics
Olympic footballers of West Germany
West German footballers
Association football goalkeepers
Footballers from North Rhine-Westphalia